Hundred  is an Indian action comedy series starring Lara Dutta and Rinku Rajguru in lead roles which is directed by Ruchi Narain, Ashutosh Shah and Taher Shabbir streaming from April 25, 2020 on Hotstar's label Hotstar Specials.

Premise 
Netra Patil (Rinku Rajguru) learns that she has only hundred days left to live because of her terminal illness meets an ambitious ACP Saumya Shukla (Lara Dutta) and becomes an undercover agent. The duo tries to accomplish their goals in the next hundred days. It contains suspense, emotional roller coaster ride, action scenes, and subtle comedy too.

Cast
 Lara Dutta as Soumya Shukla, the ambitious ACP who wants to be like James Bond but ends up being treated as "Downgraded Cop" by her department.
 Rinku Rajguru as Netra Patil, a woman with many dreams who was forced to re-evaluate her life, as she found out that she can only live for hundred days. 
 Karan Wahi as Manohar Dahiya alias Maddy
 Sudhanshu Pandey as Pravin Shukla, Soumya's husband
 Parmeet Sethi as Anshuman Goswami
 Rajeev Siddhartha as Shantanu Jha
 Jayant Gadekar as Diwakar Asole
 Rohini Hattangadi
 Makarand Deshpande as Satyendra Ahir alias Sattu Uncle
 Arun Nalawade
 Taher Shabbir
 Suyash Zunzurke

Episodes

Production 
The series was filmed in location and around Mumbai. Dutta expressed she chose the part because she hasn't portrayed cop in her career and Rajguru debuting in webspace expressed that she chose the part as bindaas Marathi mulgi in which she came to portray something different in each episode.

Release 
The series was released on April 25, 2020 by Hotstar on its label Hotstar Specials.

Promotion 
The first look and the trailer were released on April 21, 2020 revealing the release date by Hotstar.

Reception 
Divyanshi Sharma, in her review for India Today, said that "In all, despite a few hiccups, the show is an entertaining ride and deserves to be on your watch-list this weekend". Nandini Ramnath writing for, Scroll.in, said that "the show belongs to Lara and Rinku despite of its flaws". Saibal Chatterjee writing for NDTV said that "Lara Dutta and Rinku Rajguru hold Hundred together with consistent performances. Rajguru is full of beans, Dutta is steady and sedate.", giving 2.5 out of 5 stars.

References

External links 
 

Hindi-language Disney+ Hotstar original programming
2020 Indian television series debuts
Indian thriller television series
Indian action television series
Hindi-language television shows